The 2003 Breckland District Council election was part of the UK's 2003 local elections. All 54 seats were up for election. The Conservatives retained control of the council. This election was on new ward boundaries.

Summary of results

References

2003 English local elections
2003